Brateyevo may refer to:
Brateyevo District, a district of Southern Administrative Okrug, Moscow, Russia
Brateyevo, name previously proposed for Alma-Atinskaya, a future station of the Moscow Metro
Brateyevo, a motive power depot under construction